Trafalgar Glacier is a tributary glacier about 30 nautical miles (60 km) long, flowing east in the Victory Mountains to join Tucker Glacier below Bypass Hill, in Victoria Land. Named by New Zealand Geological Survey Antarctic Expedition (NZGSAE), 1957–58, in association with the Victory Mountains and after the famous British naval victory of 1805.

Glaciers of Victoria Land
Borchgrevink Coast